Sørbøvågen is a village in Hyllestad Municipality in Vestland county, Norway. The village is located along the northern shore of the Hyllestadfjorden. Sørbøvågen is a small village, but it has a retirement/nursing home, a community hall, a billiards club, and it is the site of Øn Church which serves the northwestern third of the municipality.

References

Villages in Vestland
Hyllestad